Anirudh Gyan Shikha (1 June 1928 – 25 November 2006; popularly known as Anwar Shaikh) was a British India-born British writer, who spent much of his adult life in Pakistan and United Kingdom, dying in Cardiff, Wales.

Biography
Born Hajji Muhammad Shaikh, he was born into a family descended from Kashmiri Pandit converts to Islam in the city of Gujrat located in the north of Punjab. He was born on the day of the Haj, or pilgrimage, in 1928 which prompted his parents to attach 'Hajji' to his first name, but he was also born with aposthia (in which boys are born without foreskin), which was seen as an even greater omen for a bright future; thus his name then became Muhammad Anwar Shaikh, with Anwar meaning radiant in the Arabic language. In his youth, Shaikh was an ardent believer of the Sunni branch of Islam his family devoutly practised, especially his mother, who could recite a large part of the Qur'an from memory. 

During the violent days of the Partition of India, Shikha became involved with Muslim nationalist groups and fervently participated in violent attacks they encouraged against non-Muslims. One day, he clubbed and stabbed a Sikh father, as well as his young son, to death in broad daylight. On another occasion, he bludgeoned another Sikh man he encountered on a Darabi road with a long knife. Memories of these crimes were said to have haunted him ever since. When Shaikh reached the age of 25, he began understanding Islam and rejected Quran teachings, later wrote several theological books as an ardent critic of the Islamic faith. Thereafter, he emigrated to the United Kingdom, married a Welsh woman, and became a successful businessman dealing in property development. At around this time, Shikha also converted to the Hindu religion practised by his ancestors, after reading the Rig Veda, which inspired him due to its humanism. He subsequently adopted the name Anirudh Gyan Shikha. The importance of Shaikh's work was recognized by Tariq Ali, who devoted a chapter of his book The Clash of Fundamentalisms to his views and the reaction they provoked.

Shaikh was living in Cardiff, Wales, when a fatwa was issued against him from his homeland Pakistan in 1995, where at least fourteen fundamentalist clerics issued death sentences against him for renouncing and criticising Islam. He died in Cardiff on 25 November 2006. Ali wrote that Shaikh had gained notoriety among British Muslims. Many Muslims around the world, especially those of Desi origin, have been pleading with noted Muslim scholars to write a rebuttal of Shaikh's ideas.

Works 

Islam: The Arab Imperialism, Cardiff, Principality, 1998.
The Vedic Civilization
Islam: The Arab National Movement
Islam: Sex and Violence
Islam and Human Rights
This is Jehad!
Eternity
Faith and Deception
Taxation and Liberty
Islam and Terrorism
Sexual Conflict

See also
Apostasy in Islam
Criticism of Islam
List of former Muslims
Religious conversion

Further reading
Tariq Ali, Clash of Fundamentalisms: Crusades, Jihads and Modernity (2002).

References

External links 
 Islam Watch – Books by Anwar Shaikh
 
1996 interview by Chandigarh Times, India
Arab Imperialism, by Anwar Shaikh
Review of above book, at www.freeman.org
Review of this book by Daniel Pipes
review by Koen Raadelst
Islam and Terrorism, 2004. Review by Koenraad Elst
Islam and the People of the Book – article by Anwar Shaikh

1928 births
2006 deaths
Writers of Pakistani descent
British writers
Welsh people of Kashmiri descent
Pakistani emigrants to Wales
Pakistani people of Kashmiri descent
Welsh Hindus
Converts to Hinduism from Islam
Pakistani former Muslims
British former Muslims
Former Muslim critics of Islam
Writers from Cardiff
Welsh people of Punjabi descent
British writers of Pakistani descent